Lebogang Precious Mathosa (17 July 1977 – 23 October 2006) was a South African kwaito singer. Mathosa started her career as a founding member of the popular South African band Boom Shaka in 1994 at the age of 17, after she caught the eye of music producer Don Laka at a club in Johannesburg. 

She was well known for her dyed blonde hair, her live shows and outrageous stage outfits, and was openly bisexual. She was frequently compared to the South African singer Brenda Fassie who influenced her career, who died in 2004. Mathosa won the Style Best Dressed Woman of the Year Award in 2001, and was nominated by FHM magazine as one of Africa's sexiest women.

Mathosa died in a car crash after a great performance, aged 29 when her driver lost control of the vehicle, a Toyota Prado, in which they were travelling on the N3 Highway on the East Rand.

Early life
Lebo Mathosa was born in Daveyton, a township just outside Benoni. Lebo attended St. Mary's High School. Lebo began by singing at seven years old in her local church choir. When her family moved to Johannesburg, she discovered bubblegum music, which is a kind of disco-infused pop that was popularised by people like Brenda Fassie, who Mathosa considered an idol, and was later likened to a prodigy of.

Career 
At the age of fourteen, Mathosa was discovered by a Johannesburg DJ, and soon after, she joined the group Boom Shaka. Boom Shaka became an instant success and one of the most prominent Kwaito groups in South Africa. Some have argued that the success was in part due to Mathosa's sex appeal, in attire and dance style. Boom Shaka's first album, About Time, was an instant hit, but they ran into controversy with their last album when they infused and remixed a version of the South African national anthem, "Nkosi Sikelela". After leaving Boom Shaka, Mathosa started her own solo career and was very successful. She was also a pioneer in the field of copyrights for South African artists. in a move unheard of for the industry and especially for a female, Mathosa negotiated and secured full publishing rights and ownership for her work. At the time of her death at age twenty-nine in a car accident, Mathosa had plans to start her own label.

Solo 
She turned solo in 1999. Her debut solo album Dream went gold within a month of its launch in 2000.  At the 2000 South African Music Awards, Mathosa won three South African Music Awards; Best Dance Album for Dream, Best Dance Single for her debut single Ntozabantu from the same album, and Best Female Vocalist. Her next album, Drama Queen, released in 2004, again earned the SA Music Award for Best Dance Album. Dream Queen tried different styles to break out of the house and kwaito mould.

She topped the South African pop charts in 2004, and in 2006 she was nominated for a British MOBO award (Best African Act category). She performed all over the world, from Southern Africa to Malaysia to Trafalgar Square in London, one of her most significant performances being at Nelson Mandela's 85th birthday party. She also toured the US with the show The Vagina Monologues. Her appearance in a show with such a positive feminist message is indicative of the attitude held by Mathosa, who, according to author Zine Magube, has become "a role model for many young South African women, [appearing] at first glance to simply be reinforcing stereotypes about the wanton nature of Black female sexuality. Some critics have argued however that Boom Shaka's female members have used 'the skimpy clothes, the gyrating hips, and simulated sex onstage to promote a variety of apposite concerns.'" This strong pro-feminist attitude combined with her often shocking onstage sexuality earned her the nickname "The New Madonna of the Townships". Mathosa also tried her hand acting, television shows which included Backstage, Generations and Muvhango.

Endorsements 
The late musician Lebo Mathosa, radio personality Melanie Son has received an endorsement from the legendary Jomo Sono.

Television 
Though she was mainly a singer, Mathosa had also tried her hand at acting and appeared in the local soapie Muvhango. Television and film roles soon materialised with acting and singing roles in the TV soap operas, Generations, Backstage and Muvhango, and the film Soldiers of The Rock (2003).

Documentary 
In 2019, 13 years after her death, a biopic was released about Mathosa titled Dream: The Lebo Mathosa Story . It was released on the BET Africa Network on 6 November. The biopic comprised six episodes.

Controversy 
Mathosa's adult character was played by KB Motsinyalane and her teenage years were portrayed by Bahumi Madisakwane, daughter of legendary choreographer and media personality Somizi Mhlongo and actress Palesa Madisakwane. The choice of casting of the biopic was a topic of discussion with viewers suggesting alternate actresses that resembled Mathosa would have been better suited for the role. Many suggestions made were for the role to have been reprised by Thandi Matlaila. The biopic details her personal life before her claim to fame, during the highs and lows of her career and her unfortunate demise.

Awards 

 She won the Style Best Dressed Woman of the Year Award in 2001 and was nominated by FHM magazine as one of Africa's sexiest women.
 Her second album titled Drama Queen won the South African Music Award for Best Dance Album.
 She has shared a stage with US artist Keith Sweat
 She was nominated for a British Music of Black Origin (Mobo) best African act award.

Discography
 2000: Dream
 2004: Drama Queen
 2006: Lioness

See also
 Ladies In Song - Live In Concert

References

External links 

Interview, September 24, 2006
Tributes on Reuters.
Electritying songstress
Pop Diva

1977 births
2006 deaths
Bisexual singers
Bisexual songwriters
Bisexual women
Kwaito musicians
Road incident deaths in South Africa
20th-century South African women singers
South African LGBT singers
South African LGBT songwriters
21st-century South African women singers
20th-century South African LGBT people
21st-century South African LGBT people